Miroslavské Knínice (formerly Německé Knínice) is a municipality and village in Znojmo District in the South Moravian Region of the Czech Republic. It has about 300 inhabitants.

Geography
It lies in the Bobrava Highlands.

History

The first written mention of Knínice is from 1262, when Jaroslav of Knínice was documented as the owner of a fortress in Knínice. In 1503, Knínice was bought by Lords of Lomnice, who joined the village to the Náměšť estate. It was part of the estate until 1799 and shared its fate and owners. After the death of the last lord of Lomnice in 1563, the estate was inherited by the Zierotin family, who owned it until 1628. Other notable owners were Albrecht von Wallenstein (1628–1629), the Verdenberg family (1629–1733), and the Haugwitz family (1752–1799).

Economy
The municipality is known for its viticulture and wine-making. It lies in the Znojemská wine subregion. The first mention of vineyards in the village is from 1364.

Sights
The castle is one of the landmarks of the municipality. The old fortress was rebuilt into a Baroque castle, then in the early 19th century, it was completely rebuilt into its current Neoclassical form.

The Church of Saint Nicholas was originally an early Gothic building. In 1802, it was replaced be the current Neoclassical structure.

Notable people
Friedrich Wilhelm von Haugwitz (1702–1765), Austrian statesman; died here

References

External links

Villages in Znojmo District